Cyrtodactylus amphipetraeus is a species of gecko that is endemic to Thailand.

References

Cyrtodactylus
Reptiles described in 2020
Endemic fauna of Thailand